How the West Was Won is a 1962 American epic Western film directed by Henry Hathaway (who directs three out of the five chapters involving the same family), John Ford and George Marshall, produced by Bernard Smith, written by James R. Webb, and narrated by Spencer Tracy. Originally filmed in true three-lens Cinerama with the according three-panel panorama projected onto an enormous curved screen, the film stars an ensemble cast consisting of (in alphabetical order) Carroll Baker, Lee J. Cobb, Henry Fonda, Carolyn Jones, Karl Malden, Gregory Peck, George Peppard, Robert Preston, Debbie Reynolds, James Stewart, Eli Wallach, John Wayne and Richard Widmark. The supporting cast features Brigid Bazlen, Walter Brennan, David Brian, Ken Curtis, Andy Devine, Jack Lambert, Raymond Massey as Abraham Lincoln, Agnes Moorehead, Harry Morgan as Ulysses S. Grant, Thelma Ritter, Mickey Shaughnessy, Harry Dean Stanton, Russ Tamblyn and Lee Van Cleef.

How the West Was Won is widely considered one of Hollywood's greatest epics. The film received widespread critical acclaim and was a box office success, grossing $50 million on a budget of $15 million. At the 36th Academy Awards, it earned eight nominations, including Best Picture, and won three, for Best Story and Screenplay Written Directly for the Screen, Best Sound and Best Film Editing. In 1997, it was selected for preservation in the United States National Film Registry by the Library of Congress as being "culturally, historically, or aesthetically significant".

Plot 
The film begins with narration by Spencer Tracy as the aerial-borne camera sweeps over the Rocky Mountains. "This land has a name today", says Tracy in the opening lines of the film, "and is marked on maps."

The film then moves into "The Rivers" sequence (considerably to the east of the Rockies).

The Rivers (1839) 

Mountain man Linus Rawlings (Stewart) is making his way by horse and waterway through the mountains. He confers with a group of Native Americans. The scene then shifts to Zebulon Prescott and his family.

Prescott (Malden) and his family set out west for the frontier on the Erie Canal, the "West", at this time, being the Ohio River country, at the southern edge of Illinois. Pulled the first section on a barge, they then build rafts to continue on the river free of charge. Along the journey, they meet Rawlings, who is traveling east, to Pittsburgh, to trade his furs. Rawlings and Zebulon's daughter, Eve (Carroll Baker), are attracted to each other, but Linus is not ready to settle down.

Rawlings stops at an isolated trading post, selling "likker" from a cave in the steep river bank. However, it is run by a murderous clan of river pirates, headed by "Alabama Colonel" Jeb Hawkins (Walter Brennan). Linus is betrayed when he accompanies Jeb's seductive daughter Dora Hawkins (Brigid Bazlen) into a cave, modeled after a real outlaw haunt (now a part of Cave-in-Rock State Park) to see a "varmint". Dora Hawkins stabs him in the back and Rawlings falls into a deep hole. They steal his furs and sink his canoe. But he is not mortally wounded, and follows the robbers to a site where they are conning the Prescott party from a similar fate. The bushwhacking thieves (Lee Van Cleef plays one), including Dora Hawkins, are dispatched, being killed in an attack by Rawlings, in a form of rough frontier justice.

After Zebulon prays to God for their lost loved ones and commends to Him the thieves' souls "whether You want 'em or not", the settlers continue down the river, but the lead raft is caught in rapids, and Zebulon and his wife Rebecca (Agnes Moorehead) drown. Linus encounters the survivors and decides that he cannot live without Eve, and asks to marry her and take her to Pittsburgh. However, she insists on homesteading at the spot where her parents died.

In the final scene her younger sister pines at the whistle of a paddle steamer on the wide river.

This section was directed by Henry Hathaway.

The Plains (1851) 

Eve's sister Lilith (Debbie Reynolds) chose to go back East but after some years finds herself touring in St. Louis, where she and her stage troupe are hired to perform their acts at the Music hall. She attracts the attention of professional gambler Cleve Van Valen (Gregory Peck). After overhearing that she has just inherited a California gold mine, and to avoid paying his debts to another gambler (John Larch), Cleve joins the wagon train taking her there. Wagonmaster Roger Morgan (Robert Preston) and he court her along the way, but she rejects them both, much to the dismay of her new friend and fellow traveler Agatha Clegg (Thelma Ritter), who is searching for a husband.

Surviving an attack by Cheyennes, Lilith and Cleve arrive at the mine, only to find that it is worthless. Cleve leaves. Lilith returns to work in a dance hall in a camp town, living out of a covered wagon. Morgan finds her and again proposes marriage unromantically. She tells him, "Not now, not ever."

Later, Lilith is singing in the music salon of a riverboat. By chance, Cleve is a passenger. When he hears Lilith's voice, he leaves the poker table (and a winning hand), tells her he fell in love with her at first sight, and proposes to her. He tells her of the opportunities waiting in the rapidly growing city of San Francisco. She accepts his proposal.

This section also was directed by Henry Hathaway.

The Civil War (1861–1865) 

Linus Rawlings joins the Union army as a captain in the American Civil War. Despite Eve's wishes, their son Zeb (Peppard) eagerly enlists as well, looking for glory and an escape from farming. Corporal Peterson (Andy Devine) assures them the conflict will not last very long. The bloody Battle of Shiloh shows Zeb that war is nothing like he imagined, and unknown to him, his father dies there. Zeb encounters a similarly disillusioned Confederate (Russ Tamblyn), who suggests deserting.

By chance, they overhear a private conversation between generals Ulysses S. Grant (Harry Morgan) and William Tecumseh Sherman (Wayne). The rebel realizes he has the opportunity to rid the South of two of its greatest enemies and tries to shoot them, leaving Zeb no choice but to kill him with the bayonet from his shattered musket. Afterward, Zeb rejoins the army. Footage from MGM's 1957 Film "Raintree County" of the Civil War Battle of Chickamauga were used for combat scenes during the day, as the scenes with Peppard, Tamblyn, Wayne and Morgan were all at night.

When the war finally ends, Zeb returns home as a lieutenant, only to find his mother has died. She had lost the will to live after learning that Linus had been killed. Zeb gives his share of the family farm to his brother Jeremiah, who is content to be a farmer, and leaves in search of a more interesting life.

This section was directed by John Ford.

The Railroad (1868) 

Following the daring riders from the Pony Express and the construction of the transcontinental telegraph line in the late 1860s, two ferociously competing railroad lines, the Central Pacific Railroad and the Union Pacific Railroad, one building westward and the other eastward, open up new territory to eager settlers.

Zeb becomes a lieutenant in the U.S. cavalry, trying to maintain peace with the Native Americans with the help of grizzled buffalo hunter Jethro Stuart (Fonda), an old friend of Linus's. When ruthless railroad man Mike King (Widmark) violates a treaty by building on Native American territory, the Arapahos retaliate by stampeding buffalo through his camp, killing many, including women and children. Disgusted, Zeb resigns and heads to Arizona.

A subplot was cut featuring Hope Lange as Stuart's daughter, Julie, who becomes involved in a love triangle with Zeb and King; she ultimately marries and abandons Zeb.

This section was directed by George Marshall.

The Outlaws (1889) 

In San Francisco, widowed Lilith auctions off her possessions (Cleve and she had made and spent several fortunes) to pay her debts. She travels to Arizona, inviting Zeb and his family to oversee her remaining asset, a ranch.

Zeb (now a marshal), his wife Julie (Carolyn Jones), and their children meet Lilith at Gold City's train station. However, Zeb also runs into an old enemy there, outlaw Charlie Gant (Wallach). Zeb had killed Gant's brother in a gunfight. When Gant makes veiled threats against Zeb and his family, Zeb turns to his friend and Gold City's marshal, Lou Ramsey (Lee J. Cobb), but Gant is not wanted for anything in that territory, so Ramsey can do nothing.

Zeb decides he has to act rather than wait for Gant to make good his threat someday. Suspecting Gant of planning to rob an unusually large gold shipment being transported by train, he prepares an ambush with Ramsey's reluctant help. Gant and his entire gang (one member played by Harry Dean Stanton) are killed in the shootout and resulting train wreck. In the end, Lilith and the Rawlings family travel to their new home.

This section also was directed by Henry Hathaway.

Epilogue 

A short epilogue shows how modern America has grown from the West in the early 1960s, which includes footage of the Hoover Dam, the four-level downtown freeway interchange in Los Angeles and the Golden Gate Bridge in San Francisco.

This section also was directed by Henry Hathaway.

Cast 
 Spencer Tracy as Narrator

Introduced in "The Rivers"
 James Stewart as Linus Rawlings
 Carroll Baker as Eve Prescott Rawlings
 Debbie Reynolds as Lilith Prescott van Valen
 Karl Malden as Zebulon Prescott
 Agnes Moorehead as Rebecca Prescott
 Walter Brennan as Col. Jeb Hawkins
 Brigid Bazlen as Dora Hawkins
 Lee Van Cleef as river pirate (uncredited)

Introduced in "The Plains"
 Gregory Peck as Cleve Van Valen
 Robert Preston as Roger Morgan
 Thelma Ritter as Agatha Clegg
 David Brian as Lilith's attorney
 John Larch as Grimes a gambler (uncredited)
 Clinton Sundberg as Hylan Seabury (uncredited)

Introduced in "The Civil War"
 George Peppard as Zeb Rawlings
 Andy Devine as Corporal Peterson
 Harry Morgan as Gen. Ulysses S. Grant
 John Wayne as Gen. William Tecumseh Sherman
 Russ Tamblyn as Confederate deserter
 Raymond Massey as President Abraham Lincoln
 Ken Curtis as Cpl. Ben (uncredited)

Introduced in "The Railroad"
 Henry Fonda as Jethro Stuart
 Richard Widmark as Mike King

Introduced in "The Outlaws"
 Lee J. Cobb as Marshal Lou Ramsey
 Eli Wallach as Charlie Gant
 Carolyn Jones as Zeb Rawlings' wife, Julie
 Mickey Shaughnessy as Deputy Stover
 Harry Dean Stanton as a member of Gant's gang (uncredited)
 Jack Lambert as a member of Gant's gang (uncredited)

The film marked then 66-year-old Raymond Massey's last appearance as Abraham Lincoln, a role that he previously played on stage (Abe Lincoln in Illinois and the stage adaptation of John Brown's Body), on screen (Abe Lincoln in Illinois) and on television (The Day Lincoln Was Shot, and two more productions of Abe Lincoln in Illinois).

Production

Development 
MGM had enjoyed a great success with the big screen remake of Ben-Hur (1959) and initiated a number of spectacles, including remakes of Cimarron, Four Horsemen of the Apocalypse and Mutiny on the Bounty.

In 1960, MGM struck a deal to produce four films in the Cinerama process, and Bing Crosby approached the studio with a proposition. He was developing a television spectacular called How the West Was Won based on photographs of the Old West in Life, with profits earmarked for St. John's Hospital, along with an album inspired by the same article recorded with Rosemary Clooney. MGM purchased the film rights from Crosby.

MGM announced the project in June 1960, originally titled The Great Western Story. The plan was to film a story of six segments featuring 12 stars, with a cohesive overall storyline. Among the historical figures to be featured were Buffalo Bill, the James brothers and Billy the Kid. St. John's Hospital president Irene Dunne and others persuaded the film's stars to accept less than their usual fees. However, the hospital later sued for a share of the film's profits.

Bernard Smith was assigned as producer, and he hired James Webb to write the script. George Peppard was announced as the lead in October 1960, and Irene Dunne and Bing Crosby were originally announced as stars. Laurence Harvey and John Wayne were also slated to appear in one sequence together.

By April 1961, Wayne and Spencer Tracy had confirmed their plans to play generals Sherman and Grant for a segment directed by John Ford, and James Stewart had been signed as well. Other roles would go to Gregory Peck, Debbie Reynolds, Russ Tamblyn and Carroll Baker, while Henry Hathaway and George Marshall would also direct from a script by James Webb. Crosby was scheduled to provide narration. Jim Hutton was intended to appear in the Civil War segment. Eventually, Harry Morgan appeared as Grant when Tracy was unavailable.

Ultimately, the film contained five sections: the 1830s migration, the 1840s gold rush, the Civil War, the construction of the railroad and the "taming" of the Wild West, with one family's story over three generations providing the bridge between each time period. The budget was set to at least $8 million. John Ford directed the Civil War segment, George Marshall the railroad segment and Henry Hathaway the rest. "We wanted three old pros, no young geniuses," said Smith.

Cinerama 
How the West Was Won was one of only two dramatic feature films (along with The Wonderful World of the Brothers Grimm) produced with the three-strip Cinerama process. Although the picture quality when projected onto curved screens in theaters is stunning, attempts to convert the film to a smaller screen suffer. When the film is projected in letterbox format, the actors' faces are nearly indistinguishable in long shots.

Shooting 
Filming started in May 1961 by John Ford in Paducah, Kentucky. Producer Bernard Smith said, "It is essential for our purposes that virtually the whole movie be shot outdoors. Throughout the movie, one of the basic themes is to show little people against a vast country – huge deserts, endless plains towering mountains, broad rivers. We want to capture the spirit of adventure, the restless spirit that led these men and women across the country in [the] face of many difficulties and dangers."

After Ford finished his segment, Hathaway took over on location.

Parts of the film were shot in Monument Valley, Utah and in Wildwood Regional Park in Thousand Oaks, California.

Ford complained about having to dress such huge sets, as Cinerama photographed a much wider view than did the standard single-camera process to which Hollywood directors were accustomed. Director Henry Hathaway was quoted as saying, "That damned Cinerama. Do you know a waist-shot is as close as you can get with that thing?"

A more difficult problem was that filming required that the actors to be artificially positioned out of dramatic and emotional frame and out of synchronization with one another. Only when the three-print Cinerama process was projected upon a Cinerama screen did the positions and emotions of the actors synchronize, such as normal eye contact or emotional harmony between actors in a dramatic sequence. Because of the nature of Cinerama, if the film were shown in flat-screen projection, it would appear as if the actors made no eye contact. One brief scene of Mexican soldiers was sourced by John Wayne from his 1960 version of The Alamo.

Stuntman Bob Morgan, husband of Yvonne De Carlo, was seriously injured and lost a leg during a break in filming a gunfight on a moving train while filming the Outlaws portion. Chains holding logs on a flatbed car broke, crushing Morgan as he crouched beside them.

In a scene in which George Peppard's character reminisces about his late father, Peppard improvises with an imitation of James Stewart's voice. Ford initially objected, but Peppard felt that it was important in such a long, sprawling film to remind the audience which character his father was supposed to be.

Hathaway later said that making the film was "goddam trouble. They had an idiot for a producer and Sol Siegel was drunk most of the time. We spent so much money on the picture they almost decided not to do the last part. We had a meeting, and I said, 'You can't quit. You've got to show how the West was won. The West was won when the law took over'."

Post-production 
Filming was completed in January 1962. After the film was shot, MGM ordered a new ending that resolved the family story, which caused shooting to continue for another month and included George Peppard and Debbie Reynolds. The budget eventually reached $12 million.

The film later inspired a television series of the same name.

Music 
The film's music was composed and conducted by Alfred Newman. The soundtrack album was originally released by MGM Records. Dimitri Tiomkin, known for his Western film scores, was the first composer approached, but he became unavailable following eye surgery and Newman was hired as a replacement.

The score is widely considered as among Newman's best, and it appears on the AFI's 100 Years of Film Scores list. It was nominated for the Academy Award for Best Original Score, losing to the score for Tom Jones.

Debbie Reynolds sings three songs in the film: "Raise a Ruckus Tonight" starting a party around the camp fire, "What Was Your Name in the States?" and "A Home in the Meadow" to the tune of "Greensleeves," with lyrics by Sammy Cahn. Her rendition is heard by Cleve (Gregory Peck), who is so moved that he proposes marriage. This scene ends the Plains segment.

Reception

Premiere 
Surprisingly for such an American film, How the West Was Won had its world premiere in the United Kingdom at London's Casino Cinerama Theatre on November 1, 1962. It had a $450,000 advance. The film ran at the Casino for 123 weeks, ending in April 1965.

Critical reception
Harold Myers of Variety called it a "magnificent and exciting spectacle" and in relation to the Cinerama process noted that there had been "a vast improvement in the process. The print joins are barely noticeable, and the wobble, which beset earlier productions, has been eliminated." Reviews from London were favorable but with reservations over the storyline. Alexander Walker of the Evening Standard called it "a super-epic which shucks away your sophistication. If ever I heard the sound of success it is this." The Times said "it has a kind of surge and splendour and extravagance not to be despised."

Box-office performance 
How the West Was Won was a massive commercial success. Produced on a large budget of $15 million, it grossed $46,500,000 at the North American box office, making it the second-highest-grossing film of 1963. The film has grossed over $50 million worldwide.

Accolades 
The following people won Academy Awards for their work:
 James R. Webb – Best Writing, Story and Screenplay – Written Directly for the Screen
 Harold F. Kress – Best Film Editing
 Franklin Milton – Best Sound

The following were nominated for five other Academy Awards:
 Bernard Smith – Best Picture
 George Davis, William Ferrari, Addison Hehr, Henry Grace, Don Greenwood Jr. and Jack Mills – Best Art Direction – Set Decoration, Color
 William Daniels, Milton Krasner, Charles Lang and Joseph LaShelle – Best Cinematography, Color
 Walter Plunkett – Best Costume Design, Color
 Alfred Newman and Ken Darby – Best Music, Score – Substantially Original

The film is recognized by American Film Institute in these lists:
 2005: AFI's 100 Years of Film Scores – number 25
 2006: AFI's 100 Years...100 Cheers – Nominated
 2008: AFI's 10 Top 10:
 Nominated Western Film
 Nominated Epic Film

Restoration 

In 2000, Warner Bros. assigned Crest Digital the task of restoring the original Cinerama negative for How the West Was Won. As part of the process, Crest Digital built its own authentic Cinerama screening room. Hewlett-Packard has led efforts to combine the three image portions to make the Cinerama image look more acceptable on a flat screen. This has finally been accomplished on the latest DVD and Blu-ray disc release. Previously, the lines where the three Cinerama panels join were glaringly visible, but this has been largely corrected on the Warner Bros. DVD and Blu-ray releases. However, the joints remain visible in places, especially against bright backgrounds.

The restoration also corrects some of the geometric distortions inherent in the process. For instance, in the final shot, the Golden Gate Bridge appears to curve in perspective as the camera flies underneath it whereas in the Cinerama version, it breaks into three straight sections at different angles.

The Blu-ray disc also contains a "SmileBox" version simulating the curved-screen effect.

Though the aspect ratio of Cinerama is 2.59:1, Warner's new releases of the film offer an aspect ratio of 2.89:1, incorporating much information on both sides that was not intended to be seen when projected. The Blu-ray-exclusive SmileBox alternative contains the intended cropping intact.

In 2006, Warner Bros. Motion Picture Imaging performed digital restoration on How the West Was Won. The film was restored frame by frame at Prasad Corporation to remove dirt, tears, scratches and other damage, restoring the film's original appearance. The restored version has been shown on television since October 2008 on the Encore Westerns channel.

Adaptations 
 Gold Key Comics: How the West Was Won (July 1963)
 The novelization was written in 1962 by well-known Western author Louis L'Amour. According to his son Beau, his father had frequent clashes with the studio, both over elements of inauthenticity and inaccuracy in the film, and with the indecisiveness of the studio regarding the segments to be made, and thus, those that L'Amour would need to include in the novelization.

See also 
 List of American films of 1963
 List of American films of 1962

References

External links 

 
 
 
 
 
 How the West Was Won essay by Daniel Eagan in America's Film Legacy: The Authoritative Guide to the Landmark Movies in the National Film Registry, A&C Black, 2010 , pages 584–586 

1960s English-language films
1962 films
1962 Western (genre) films
American Civil War films
American Western (genre) epic films
Articles containing video clips
Cultural depictions of Ulysses S. Grant
Fictional depictions of Abraham Lincoln in film
Films adapted into comics
Films adapted into television shows
Films directed by George Marshall
Films directed by Henry Hathaway
Films directed by John Ford
Films scored by Alfred Newman
Films scored by Ken Darby
Films set in 1839
Films set in 1851
Films set in 1861
Films set in 1865
Films set in 1868
Films set in 1889
Films set in Arizona
Films set in California
Films shot in California
Films shot in Illinois
Films shot in Kentucky
Films shot in Oregon
Films shot in South Dakota
Films shot in Utah
Films that won the Best Sound Mixing Academy Award
Films whose editor won the Best Film Editing Academy Award
Films whose writer won the Best Original Screenplay Academy Award
Metro-Goldwyn-Mayer films
Photoplay Awards film of the year winners
United States National Film Registry films
1960s American films